Rohene Andre Ward (born June 28, 1983) is a retired American figure skater and choreographer. He competed four times at the U.S. Championships, in 2002, 2004, 2006 and 2008. He also competed for Puerto Rico and is the 2004 Puerto Rican national champion.

Career 
Ward is known for his flexibility, athleticism, and charisma, as well as jumping and spinning in both directions. His moves include the cantilever, the hydroblade, and the splits.

Ward was coached by Page Lipe in Minneapolis for 18 years. He attended North Community High School where he graduated in 2001. In 2005, he began training under coach Robin Wagner.

In 2007, Ward and Lipe co-coached Kirsten Olson. In 2007, he began co-coaching with Kori Ade in Highland Park, Illinois. At the 2008 U.S. Figure Skating Championships in Saint Paul, Minnesota, he became the first U.S. coach to compete in the national championships while also coaching another participant (Olson in the junior ladies' competition).

During the 2010–11 ice show season, Ward played Aladdin in Holiday on Ice's (HOI) European tour. He was then asked to be a principal skater in the HOI shows "Speed" and "Speed II", touring parts of Europe from the Netherlands to Norway from 2011–2013. In the 2013–14 season, he performed as a principal in the new HOI production of "Platinum" in France and Germany.

In spring 2013, Ward and Ade moved to Monument, Colorado to further expand 7K Skating Academy. They have coached several top students, including Jason Brown.

Choreographer 
Ward is also a choreographer, working with a variety of skaters, including Brown, Courtney Hicks, Jordan Moeller, and Mariah Bell. In his choreography, he avoids music with lyrics, saying that "It inhibits the ability to create, because the words dictate." His choreography won critical acclaim when Brown's long program "Riverdance" ("Reel Around the Sun" by Bill Whelan) created an internet sensation, garnering more than five million YouTube hits following the 2014 US Championships. Ward won "Choreographer of the Year" at the 2015 PSA conference in Bloomington, Minnesota. He won a second time in 2017 in Nashville, Tennessee. In between, Ward choreographed the opening ceremonies at the 2016 U.S. Championships.

In 2020, Ward and Brown co-choreographed a tribute to Alvin Ailey set to Nina Simone's version of "Sinnerman," which Brown competed in both the 2020-2021 and 2021-2022 seasons, including at the 2022 Winter Olympics.

As of April 2021, Ward coaches at Fox Valley Ice Arena in Geneva, Illinois.

Skaters who Ward has choreographed for include:

 Mariah Bell
 Jason Brown
 Karen Chen
 Madison Chock/Evan Bates
 Courtney Hicks
 Tomoki Hiwatashi 
 Alysa Liu
 Jordan Moeller
 Kaori Sakamoto
 Anastasiia Smirnova/Danylo Siianytsia

Programs

Results

References

External links

 Ward at LatinoSkating.org

American male single skaters
Puerto Rican figure skaters
1983 births
Living people
Sportspeople from Minneapolis
North Community High School alumni
Figure skating choreographers